The ambassador of the Islamic Republic of Afghanistan to the United States of America was the official diplomatic representative of the Islamic Republic of Afghanistan to the United States. The ambassador and the embassy staff at large worked at the Afghan Embassy in the Kalorama neighborhood of Washington, D.C. The last ambassador of the Islamic Republic of Afghanistan was Adela Raz, who succeeded Roya Rahmani in July 2021. In February 2022, Raz resigned. The embassy and consulates closed the following month, and all diplomatic and consular activities stopped.

List

Chief of Protocol

References

 
United States
Afghanistan